The City That Never Sleeps is a 1924 American silent drama film directed by James Cruze.

Cast

Preservation
With no prints of The City That Never Sleeps located in any film archives, it is a lost film.

References

External links

Reviews at silentsaregolden.com

1924 films
Films directed by James Cruze
1924 drama films
American silent feature films
American black-and-white films
Silent American drama films
Lost American films
1924 lost films
Lost drama films
1920s American films